Cinachyra is a genus of sponge belonging to the family Tetillidae.

Species
There are four species recognized in the genus:
Cinachyra antarctica (Carter, 1872)
Cinachyra barbata Sollas, 1886
Cinachyrella crassispicula (Lendenfeld, 1907)
Cinachyra helena Rodriguez & Muricy, 2007

References

External links 
  (ITIS)

Bibliography 
 Cristovao, A. J., Cenleno, J. A., & Collety, P. (2006). Bioaccumulation of metals in the Genus Cinachyra (Porifera) from the Mid-Atlantic Ridge. Metal Ions in Biology and Medicine, 9, 175.

Spirophorida